Francis Henry "Frank" Atkins (1847–1927) was a British writer of "pulp fiction", in particular science fiction aimed at younger readers. He wrote under the pseudonyms Frank Aubrey and Fenton Ash.

His son was writer Frank Howard Atkins.

Bibliography

The Devil-Tree of El Dorado: A Romance of British Guiana (1897)
A Queen of Atlantis: A Romance of the Caribbean (1899)
King of the Dead: A Weird Romance (1903)
The Sacred Mountain (1904)
The Sunken Island, or the Pirates of Atlantis (1904)
The Radium Seekers, or The Wonderful Black Nugget (1905)
The Temple of Fire, or The Mysterious Island (1905)
The Hermit of the Mountains (1907)
A Trip to Mars (1907)
A Son of the Stars (1908)
A King of Mars (1909)
By Airship to Ophir (1911)
The Black Opal: A Romance of Thrilling Adventure (1915)
In Polar Seas (1916)

References

External links

 
 
 
 LC catalogue records as Fenton Ash (2) 
 Fenton Ash in WorldCat libraries (see also Frank Aubrey, below)

1847 births
1927 deaths
British science fiction writers
20th-century pseudonymous writers